The Momats River is a river in southern Western Papua (now Papua province), Indonesia.

Geography
The river flows in the southern area of Papua with predominantly tropical rainforest climate (designated as Af in the Köppen-Geiger climate classification). The annual average temperature in the area is 23 °C. The warmest month is December, when the average temperature is around 25 °C, and the coldest is July, at 21 °C. The average annual rainfall is 6240 mm. The wettest month is August, with an average of 690 mm rainfall, and the driest is January, with 402 mm rainfall.

See also
List of rivers of Indonesia
List of rivers of Western New Guinea

References

Rivers of West Papua (province)
Rivers of Indonesia